(Special Command Blaich) was a German unit consisting of s Heinkel He 111H medium bomber supported by an Italian Savoia-Marchetti SM.82 transport aircraft and a Messerschmitt Bf 108. In January 1942 the Heinkel raided the Free French–controlled Fort Lamy in the Chad region of French Equatorial Africa. The raid against a target  from Axis bases in North Africa was a success but on its return flight the Heinkel ran out of fuel and had to make an emergency landing; the crew and aircraft were rescued a week later.

Background

Fort Lamy
Chad and Fort Lamy had been captured by the Free French in 1940 and was a staging post for the Capture of Kufra, operations against the Kufra oasis group. The British attacked Axis ammunition dumps, fuel dumps, radio stations, airfields and other rear units. An important LRDG base was the Free French airfield at Fort Lamy on the banks of Lake Chad, which was also part of the Royal Air Force delivery route from RAF Takoradi in Ghana, to Egypt.

Theo Blaich

Blaich understood the importance of Fort Lamy as a way point in the overland transport and communication route from the west coast of Africa to the Nile, as well as an assembly point for Allied operations against Libya. Blaich proposed the capture of Fort Lamy to safeguard the southern border of Libya. When his suggestions were dismissed, he proposed that he should at least carry out a bombing raid. The date for the operation was set for 21 January 1942, to coincide with an Axis attack against the British at El Agheila.

Prelude

Plan
 was an Axis force comprising German and Italian personnel, equipped with a He 111H from II/ 4 with all excess equipment, including the dorsal and ventral guns removed, a Savoia-Marchetti SM.82 transport aircraft carrying extra fuel for the Heinkel and Blaich's , which were to depart from the oasis of Hun on 20 January. The Heinkel crew and Blaich were to go on the raid, while the Italian support crew, except for the pilot,  (Major) Roberto Count Vimercati-San Severino, stayed behind.

He had surveyed and marked out the site later but it lacked facilities. The  was used as the supply base and the Heinkel was refuelled by hand from fuel drums.

Raid

Outward flight

The aircraft had been loaded with  but the weather increased fuel consumption. Geissler had to use dead reckoning, there being radio stations from which he could get a direction finding (D/F) fix. The Heinkel reached the lake by noon, after which navigation became easier, despite the storm intensifying. Being so remote, the airfield and supply depot had no air defences; the Heinkel crew could not delay and made one bombing run. The sixteen  bombs were dropped unhindered on the fuel dump at the edge of the airfield.

Return journey
The Heinkel was undamaged and turned northwards but the crew knew that the detour made it impossible to reach  with the fuel remaining. Wireless contact with the Italian support crew had been lost on the outbound leg and could not be re-established. At 18:00, towards sunset,  short of  Bohnsack made an emergency landing on a high plateau. The six men had  of water. Wichmann, the wireless operator, set up his 3-Watt wireless aerial, laying it out on tent poles. The Italian support crew was still out of contact and three days later, Benghazi sent a message that the Italians had been contacted and that they were searching for the Heinkel. On the fifth day, the crew transmitted a D/F signal with the Heinkel wireless, running one engine, with the little fuel that remained, to power the wireless generator. Within the hour an Italian Caproni Ca.309 landed and delivered water and melons to the Heinkel crew. On the next day a Junkers Ju 52 arrived with more water and fuel.

Aftermath

The attack on Fort Lamy caused minor damage to installations and few casualties but destroyed fuel supplies, despite strenuous efforts to save them, reducing the supply of the Free French and the RAF in the region by half. The raid caused General Philippe Leclerc to strengthen the anti-aircraft defences at Fort Lamy and to start hit-and-run operations against the Italian forces in the Fezzan region of Libya.  continued operations against the LRDG during the first half of 1942. In June 1942 the Heinkel bomber crashed near Kufra after an engine failure. The crew was rescued four days later but had to set the Heinkel on fire and this ended the  operations.

References

Bibliography

Further reading
 

Conflicts in 1942
1942 in Africa
Military operations of World War II involving Germany
Battles and operations of World War II involving France
North African campaign
N'Djamena
1940s in Chad
Airstrikes conducted by Germany